Edward Colston House, also known as Medway, is a historic home located at Falling Waters, Berkeley County, West Virginia. It was built about 1798 and is a two-story, three-bay, gable-roofed frame dwelling.  The two-story, three-bay, gable-roofed frame wing was added about 1900. It is a rare 18th-century frame building and representative of the transition from the Georgian to Federal style.

It was listed on the National Register of Historic Places in 2003.

References

Houses on the National Register of Historic Places in West Virginia
Georgian architecture in West Virginia
Federal architecture in West Virginia
Houses completed in 1798
Houses in Berkeley County, West Virginia
National Register of Historic Places in Berkeley County, West Virginia